Douglas Goldstein (born September 12, 1971) is an American screenwriter and television producer and director, primarily known for his work as co-head writer on the late-night animated series Robot Chicken. He won three Emmy Awards for episodes of Robot Chicken and has won three Annie Awards including one for Robot Chicken: Star Wars Episode II.

Life and career
Born to a Jewish family,  Goldstein was a founding member of Wizard Entertainment. During his 13 years at Wizard he was an editor, senior editor, and vice president of special projects, overseeing publications including Anime Insider, Toy Wishes, ToyFare, Toons, Sci-Fi Invasion, and numerous custom publishing works.

Goldstein was an editor and writer of ToyFare's humor strip Twisted ToyFare Theater for much of its run from 1997–2011. It has been compiled into several collected volumes.

He is one of the founding members of Robot Chicken, which hired a number of other writers from Twisted ToyFare Theater. Goldstein  was also a writer and associate producer on Robot Chicken's predecessor show, Sweet J Presents, a series of twelve animated shorts which ran from 2001–2002 on Sony Entertainment's Screenblast.com.

Goldstein has written the half-hour animated pilot The Neighborhood for 20th Century Fox. He was a writer on Lucasfilm's Star Wars Detours animated series. He is the creator, writer and executive producer of the animated comedy "Devil May Care" starring Alan Tudyk and airing on SyFy's TZGZ programming block.

References

External links 
 
 G4tv interview
 UGO.com interview

American television directors
American television producers
American television writers
Jewish American screenwriters
American male television writers
Living people
1971 births
Annie Award winners
Primetime Emmy Award winners
21st-century American Jews